The 48th Infantry Division (48-ya Pekhotnaya Diviziya) was an infantry formation of the Russian Imperial Army.

Organization
1st Brigade
189th Infantry Regiment
190th Infantry Regiment
2nd Brigade
191st Infantry Regiment
192nd Infantry Regiment
48th Artillery Brigade

References

Infantry divisions of the Russian Empire
Military units and formations disestablished in 1918